In parts of northern New Jersey, a sloppy joe is a cold delicatessen sandwich. There are minor variations depending on the deli, but it is always a double decker thin sliced rye bread sandwich made with one or more types of sliced deli meat, such as turkey, ham, pastrami, corned beef, roast beef, or sliced beef tongue, along with Swiss cheese, coleslaw, and Russian dressing.

Ham is often considered the standard meat. Some delis that offer the New Jersey sloppy joe, such as Mr. J's Deli in Cranford, label the ham version as a regular joe. The Millburn Deli in Millburn is a noted sloppy joe maker.

The Town Hall Deli in South Orange claims to have invented the New Jersey sloppy joe in the 1930s. According to the deli's owner, a Maplewood politician, Thomas Sweeney, returned from a vacation in Cuba, where he spent time at a bar named Sloppy Joe's. The bar's owner laid out fixings for patrons, who put sandwiches together. Sweeney asked Town Hall to cater his poker games with the same sort of sandwiches, and they caught on.

In the '50s, several Jewish delis in Newark and surroundings were also selling the sandwich, including places like Tabatchnicks, Kartzman's, Karpen's Deli in Passaic, and Union Pantry in Union.

Mainstream supermarkets in the region, such as Kings, sometimes label sandwiches turkey sloppy joes to distinguish them from the ground beef sandwich of the same name. A similar sandwich referred to as the New York deli turkey sandwich is also found in New York City and the region. It is similar to the Sloppy Joe in that it includes cole slaw and Russian dressing and usually comes on rye bread. However, it is not normally a double decker and is not usually cut in three wedges.

See also
Cuisine of New Jersey
List of sandwiches
Reuben sandwich

References 

New Jersey culture
Cheese sandwiches
Cuisine of the Mid-Atlantic states
Rye-based dishes